Rachel Fuller Brown (November 23, 1898 – January 14, 1980) was a chemist best known for her long-distance collaboration with microbiologist Elizabeth Lee Hazen in developing the first useful antifungal antibiotic, nystatin, while doing research for the Division of Laboratories and Research of the New York State Department of Health. Brown received her B.A. from Mount Holyoke College and her Ph.D from the University of Chicago. She was inducted into the National Inventors Hall of Fame in 1994.

Nystatin, still produced today under various trade names, not only cures a variety of potentially devastating fungal infections, but has also been used to combat Dutch Elm disease in trees and to restore artwork damaged by water and mold.

Life 
On November 23, 1898, Rachel Fuller Brown was born in Springfield, Massachusetts. When Rachel was 14 years old, her father left her family. Rachel went to Commercial High School, but later switched to Central High School because her mother wanted her to have a more traditional education. Henriette F. Dexter, a friend of Rachel’s grandmother, saw how determined Rachel was to go to college and paid for her to attend Mount Holyoke College. She majored in chemistry and earned her B.A. in chemistry and history in 1920. Eventually, she earned an M.S. in organic chemistry from the University of Chicago. After taking some courses at Harvard, Brown came back to the University of Chicago for more graduate work. She submitted her Ph. D thesis, but there were complications and she had to leave Chicago without a Ph. D. She found a job at the Division of Laboratories and Research in New York. The Division of Laboratories and Research was known for its research in creating vaccines and antiserums. Brown worked there for 7 years and then returned to Chicago to receive her Ph.D.

In 1948, Brown began a project with Elizabeth Lee Hazen, who was researching fungus and bacteria. This project led to these two women to discover an antibiotic that fought fungal infections. In the 1930s, antibiotics were becoming more popular to fight bacteria, but a side effect was that the antibiotics caused fungus to grow. The antibiotics were so strong, they killed all the bacteria, including the healthy bacteria; this left no bacteria to control the fungus. The fungus caused sore mouths or stomach pain. Other fungi attacked the central nervous system and caused ringworm and athlete’s foot. However, there were no medications to fight fungal diseases.
Elizabeth cultured organisms found in soil and tested them to fight against fungi. If there was good activity, she would send it to Rachel in a mason jar. Brown would isolate the active agent in the culture, which could be used to cure fungal diseases. After testing hundreds of soil samples that were highly toxic to animals and not safe for humans, the two women found a culture that could work for animals. They discovered that this microorganism produced two antifungal substances. One of these was too toxic for test animals, but the other one was promising. They created and named the drug Nystatin. Nystatin was the first antifungal antibiotic that was safe for human disease. It could be combined with antibacterial drugs to help with side effects. Nystatin was also effective in stopping growth of fungi on works of art in Italy that were damaged by flooding. In 1950, Brown and Hazen showed their work at the National Academy of Sciences, and in 1954 the drug was made for human use.

Later years

In 1951, the Department of Health and Laboratories promoted Brown to associate biochemist. Brown and Hazen, in continuing their research, discovered two additional antibiotics—phalmycin and capacidin. The two continued to work closely together in making additional minor contributions to the field of bacteriology until their retirement.

Brown died on January 14, 1980, at the age of 81 in Albany, New York.

Awards and recognition

Royalties for nystatin totaled $13.4 million. As Brown and Hazen did not want any of the money for themselves, the philanthropic Research Corporation used half for grants to further scientific research and the other half to support what became known as the Brown-Hazen Fund.

Both Brown and Hazen received many awards for their collaborative work, the first major prize being the Squibb Award in Chemotherapy in 1955. Brown was also elected fellow of the New York Academy of Sciences in 1957. On Brown’s retirement in 1968, she received the Distinguished Service Award of the New York Department of Health. In 1972, she was also given the Rhoda Benham Award of the Medical Mycological Society of the Americas. Brown and Hazen were the first women ever to receive, in 1975, the American Institute of Chemists’ Chemical Pioneer Award.

Brown was inducted into the National Inventors Hall of Fame in 1994.

Philanthropy

Brown was a member of St. Peter’s Episcopal Church since she first arrived in Albany. There she met Dorothy Wakerley, a woman who became her lifelong friend and companion. They shared a house, and like many other unmarried women during their time, they cared for an extended family over the years. They lived with Brown’s grandmother, mother, and various nieces as well as nephews. Brown also invited a succession of visiting women scientists from China. Brown continued her active community life in retirement, becoming the first female vestry, or administrative member, of her Episcopalian church. She also taught Sunday school for many years.

Between 1957 and 1978, the Brown-Hazen Fund supported training and research in biomedical sciences and encouraged women to take up careers in science. For several years the fund was the largest single source of nonfederal funds for medical mycology in the United States.

For over fifty years, Brown was also an active member of the American Association of University Women, strongly supporting the participation of women in science.

By her death, Brown had not only paid back Henriette Dexter, the wealthy woman who made it possible for her to attend college, but possibly more important, the money she earned from royalties allowed her to create new funds for scientific research and scholarships to provide other scientists with the same opportunities.

In a statement published in the Chemist the month of her death, Brown said she hoped for a future of “equal opportunities and accomplishments for all scientists regardless of sex.”

References

External links
 
 Brown, Rachel, 1898–1980. Papers of Rachel Brown and Elizabeth Lee Hazen, 1937–1981: A Finding Aid,  Radcliffe Institute for Advanced Study, Harvard University

1898 births
1980 deaths
American women chemists
Women inventors
University of Chicago alumni
Harvard University alumni
Mount Holyoke College alumni
Shimer College faculty
20th-century American women scientists
20th-century American chemists
20th-century American inventors
Chemists from Missouri
American women academics
New York State Department of Health